Michel Polnareff (born 3 July 1944, Nérac, Lot-et-Garonne, France) is a French singer-songwriter, who was popular in France from the mid-1960s until the early 1990s with his penultimate original album, Kāma-Sūtra. He is still critically acclaimed and occasionally tours in France, Belgium and Switzerland.

Biography and career

Resounding beginnings (1966–1973)

Early years 
He attended the Cours Hattemer, a private school. He learned the guitar, and after his studies, military service, and a brief time in insurance, he began to play his guitar on the steps of the Sacré Cœur.

Early successes 

In 1965 Polnareff won a prize in Paris of recording at Barclay Records, but as part of the counterculture he turned down this opportunity. It was Lucien Morisse, then director at Europe 1, who made him sign with AZ. His first disc, La Poupée qui fait non (1966), was an unexpected success. Its new musical style and Polnareff's atypical image, crossed borders. During this period, he played concerts in Brussels for one week sharing the bill with Jeff Beck. In France he gained many hits such as "La Poupée qui fait non", "Love me, please love me", "Sous quelle étoile suis-je né?", "Ta-ta-ta-ta", "Âme câline" (Soul Coaxing), "Mes regrets", "Gloria", "Holidays", and "Tibili". Jimmy Page and John Paul Jones performed on hit single "Holidays".

An atypical character
Polnareff also played with his image: black glasses, fancy trousers, and ambiguous provocations. His song L'Amour avec Toi could not be played before 10 pm because it was considered "pornographic" at the time in France (the song is mild by today's standards). From 1969 on, Polnareff was hugely successful: tours, music videos, hits. He also became the target of scandalmongers.

Depression and distance
Tragedy struck in September 1970, when his friend Lucien Morisse died by suicide. In the same time, he also suffered a relationship crisis. After a rest period in the Paris area, and long months in isolation healing from his depression, Polnareff gradually resumed touring. His health and his morale improved, but not his sight: he was forced to protect his eyes with thick, dark sunglasses. His problems didn't stop there. In 1972, a promotional poster for his 1972 Polnarevolution tour showed his naked buttocks. Although the scandal benefitted him commercially, it brought censorship and lawsuits.

Exile in the United States (1973–1984)
During a world tour, he learned that Bernard Seneau, his manager, had run off with his money leaving him broke. Unable to pay his debts, and crushed by the death of his mother, he left France for the United States, where he lived in anonymity. He was joined by his friend, Annie Fargue who became his manager and stayed in this capacity for many years.

In 1975, his song Jesus for Tonight made it onto the American Billboard. He also created the soundtrack for the exploitation rape drama Lipstick (1976), which starred American model Margaux Hemingway and her sister Mariel. But his success in the United States was not as great as in France. Polnareff missed his fellow musicians and the French musical community. He developed a passion for computers. During the 1975 tour he performed in Belgium, and thousands of his French fans came over to see him. His forced exile did not prevent him from composing, and his albums had mixed success. In summer 1977, he released a new song called "Lettre à France"; it wasn't a song written for a girl called France but rather for his country that he missed a lot. The song was co-written by a friend of his, a successful writer in France, Jean-Loup Dabadie. Polnareff asked him to write lyrics, and Dabadie's idea was to write an imaginary letter to France, the country Polnareff had left. This song immediately became very popular in France.

In 1978, he released the album titled "Coucou me revoilou", which wasn't particularly successful. It was the next album called Bulles and released in 1981 that was very well received and proved that he was still hugely popular in France. In 1985, he released yet another album,  "Incognito".

Return to France (1984–1994)
Polnareff made a surprise return to France in 1989. Without any promotion, "Goodbye Marylou" invaded the airwaves and became a hit. For a year and a half, Polnareff was locked up at Royal Monceau in Paris and recorded Kāma-Sūtra, with Mike Oldfield adding some guitar parts. The album was released in February 1990, met with commercial success and marked Polnareff's true return with hits such as "Kâma Sûtra", "LNA HO" and "Toi et moi".

Rumors spread about his health, and in 1994, he finally decided to have a cataract surgically (and successfully) removed to prevent him from becoming blind.

From The Roxy to Bercy : rebirth (1995–2006)
Polnareff returned to the United States and performed live (for the first time in ages) on 27 September 1995 at The Roxy in Sunset Boulevard with executive-producer / guitarist Dick Smith (Earth, Wind and Fire, Aretha Franklin) and Alex Acuña (Weather Report, Elvis Presley and Michael Jackson). The performance was released in 1996 as the ambitious live album Live at the Roxy. The album achieved platinum certification in France. To mark this occasion, the channel Canal + devoted a special to him entitled "À la Recherche de Polnareff" ("In Search of Polnareff"), in which he appeared in military uniform (from whence his recent nickname "The Admiral" may come) and was interviewed in the desert by Michel Denisot. This was followed by an acoustic mini-concert in the middle of the California desert.

Following the media attention in 1995 and 1996, Polnareff could have restarted his career as though nothing had happened. However, his fans still await, almost twenty years later, an album which may never come. However, some of his early songs became popular again, like "La Poupée qui fait non" covered by Mylène Farmer and Khaled (1996), and "On Ira Tous au Paradis", which became the theme song of Restaurants du Cœur in 1998. His 1977 hit "Lettre à France" enjoyed a new success in 2004 following its inclusion on the French version of the Star Academy talent contest.

On 22 November 2004, and again on 18 December 2005, France 3 broadcast a one and a half-hour documentary entitled "Michel Polnareff Dévoilé" ("Michel Polnareff Revealed"). It includes images from rare files mixed with interviews with media personalities like Marc-Olivier Fogiel, Jacques Séguéla, Jean-Luc Lahaye and Frédéric Beigbeder explaining to the televiewers what Michel Polnareff represented for them and for France. Polnareff also revealed that he was working on a new album.

Return to the stage (2007)
On 12 May 2006, Michel Polnareff announced that he would be giving a series of concerts between 2 and 14 March 2007. Ticket sales rocketed, showing that Polnareff has not lost his gleam. On Bastille Day, 2007, Polnareff gave a free concert.

In 2001, death rapper Necro sampled Polnareff's "Voyages" for his song "Light My Fire". English band The Shortwave Set sampled this song as well for their single "Is It Any Wonder?" in 2005.
Masher (L)SD sampled "Sous Quelle E'toile Suis Je ne?" for his tune
"Howards' Thinking Clearly", on the CD "That's CRAZY Music!" (2005)

The 2004 Korean TV drama "Sorry, I love You" in Korean 미안하다, 사랑한다 ("Mi'an'ha'da, Sa'rang'han'da" or aka "MiSa") soundtrack largely drew from Polnareff songs like "Qui a tué Grand-Maman ?" and "ça n'arrive qu'aux autres". It was aired on channel KBS 2004/11/09~2004/12/28. The soundtrack was released in two commercial CDs.

In the studio (2010–2015)
In November 2013, Polnareff had sold in total 3,9 million albums and 4,9 million singles in France.

In 2014, a documentary, called "Quand l'écran s'allume" pictured Polnareff, his partner Danyellah and their son Louka, in theatres first, and on TV a few months later.

At the end of 2014, Polnareff started recording a new album.

New single and new tour (2015–2017)
On 8 December 2015, Polnareff announced the release of his new album in the first half of 2016 (between January and April 2016) and a new tour of 50 dates, mostly in France but also in Belgium and Switzerland, split into two legs : a Summer leg due to start on 30 April 2016 in Epernay and to end on 26 July 2016 (including a four-date stay at the Paris-Bercy Arena in early May 2016 and many appearances at Summer Festivals) and an Autumn leg due to start on 4 November 2016 and to end on 10 December 2016 in Bordeaux.

On 18 December 2015, a week before Christmas, Polnareff released "L'Homme en rouge", the first single from his upcoming album and his first single since 2006 (only as a digital download and on streaming). "L'Homme en rouge" deals with Santa Claus.

In late April 2016, just before the beginning of the tour, Polnareff revealed that the new album was not finished yet, as he's still working on 3 of the 9 announced tracks due to appear on it, that he has planned to play live during the tour a new song from it entitled "Sumi" about his SM experience with a geisha in Fukuoka, Japan and that a song he wrote about his son Louka – simply entitled "Louka's song" – will appear on the new album. In december 2016, before the last concert of his tour he suffered a double pulmonary embolism and had to cancel the end of his tour.

New album (2018)
On 3 October 2018, Polnareff announced the forthcoming release on 30 November 2018 of Enfin!, his (28-year) long-awaited new studio album. The album received a warm reception from the press and the fans.

Personal life

He had many girlfriends, including his manager Annie Fargue. The two dated for over 20 years but were never married. In 2004, he met Danyellah, a French journalist and model. On 28 December 2010, Polnareff's girlfriend Danyellah gave birth to a boy, Louka, in Los Angeles; the baby was delivered by Polnareff. On 21 February 2011, Polnareff announced via a Facebook post that a DNA test had revealed that he was not the biological father of the child. A later post indicated that his girlfriend had disappeared with the baby.
They were separated for a few months, but are now reunited with their son, Louka. They lived in a house in Palm Springs where Polnareff had his own recording studio.

Discography

In popular culture
Jean-Pierre Polnareff, a character in the Japanese manga series JoJo's Bizarre Adventure, is named after Michel Polnareff.

Publications
 1974: Polnaréflexions in collaboration with Jean-Michel Desjeunes, Editions Dire/Stock2
 2004: Polnareff par Polnareff in collaboration with Philippe Manœuvre, Editions Grasset et Fasquelle
 2013: Le Polnabook, de Michel Polnareff, Editions Ipanéma
 2016: Spèrme, de Michel Polnareff, Editions Plon

Bibliography 
 Christian Eudeline, Derrière les lunettes, ed. fayard, 2013
 Benoît Cachi, Polnaculte : Michel Polnareff vu par ses auteurs et par lui-même, ed. Tournon, 2007
 Christophe Lauga, Polnareffmania, ed. Scali, 2007
 , Polnareff, la véritable histoire d'une légende, ed. City, 2007
 Philippe Margotin, Polnareff, ed. de la Lagune, 2007
 Fabien Lecœuvre, Michel Polnareff, ed. Vaderetro, 2004

References

External links 
 Biography of Michel Polnareff, from Radio France Internationale
 Official Web Site : Michel Polnareff (news, discography, photos...)

1944 births
Living people
People from Nérac
French people of Jewish descent
French people of Russian-Jewish descent
French people of Ukrainian-Jewish descent
French people of Breton descent
French male singers
French male guitarists
French-language singers